Murrum Station, most often referred to as Murrum, is a pastoral lease operating as a sheep station in Western Australia.

Murrum is adjoined by Yoweragabbie Station.

William Fitzgerald acquired Murrum at some time prior to 1908; he died in 1934 at Murrum. His son, Victor Fitzgerald, was the manager of the property at the time.

See also
List of ranches and stations
List of pastoral leases in Western Australia

References

Pastoral leases in Western Australia
Stations (Australian agriculture)
Mid West (Western Australia)